Statistics of the French Amateur Football Championship in the 1926-27 season.  The Championship was the main competition for the amateur football clubs from 1926 to 1929.  There were 3 divisions: Excellence, Honor and Promotion.

Excellence Division
CA Paris      4  2  2  0        6
Amiens AC              4  2  1  1        5
Olympique de Marseille           4  1  2  1        4
SC de la Bastidienne (Bordeaux)  4  1  1  2  8-12  3
FC Rouennais                     4  0  2  2        2

Honour Division
AS Valentigney                   3  2  1  0 10- 4  5
RC Strasbourg                    3  2  0  1 11- 7  4
CA Messin                        3  2  0  1  9- 8  4
SC Reims                         3  1  1  1  3- 6  3
CO Saint-Chamond                 4  0  0  4  7-15  0

References
RSSF

French Amateur Football Championship
France
1926–27 in French football